Jalognes is a commune in the Cher department in the Centre-Val de Loire region of France.

Geography
The river Chantraine flows through the commune's southern territory.

Population

Sights
 The church of St. Madeleine, dating from the twelfth century.
 The castle of Pesselières, dating from the twelfth century.
 An ancient chapel at Chantereine.
 A watermill.

See also
Communes of the Cher department

References

External links

Website about Jalognes  
Webpage about the history of Jalognes 

Communes of Cher (department)